Luc Brouillet (born 1954) is a Canadian botanist. He has focused his research on genetics of the Asteraceae family, flora of Quebec-Labrador and Newfoundland, and has been significantly involved in the Flora of North America project. In 2016 the Canadian Botanical Association awarded him the George Lawson Medal.

References

External links

Publication list at IRBV

1954 births
Living people
American botanical writers
20th-century American botanists
21st-century American botanists
University of Waterloo alumni